The 1982 Toyota Women's Tennis Classic was a women's tennis tournament played on outdoor hard courts in Atlanta, Georgia in the United States that was part of the 1982 Avon Championships World Championship Series. It was the fifth edition of the tournament and was held from August 9 through August 15, 1982. First-seeded Chris Evert-Lloyd won the singles title and earned $18,000 first-prize money.

Finals

Singles
 Chris Evert-Lloyd defeated  Susan Mascarin 6–3, 6–1
 It was Evert's 5th singles title of the year and the 115th of her career.

Doubles
 Kathy Jordan /  Betsy Nagelsen defeated  Chris Evert-Lloyd /  Billie Jean King 4–6, 7–6(13–11), 7–6(7–3)

References

External links
 ITF tournament edition details

Toyota Women's Tennis Classic
Virginia Slims of Atlanta
Toyota Women's Tennis Classic
Toyota Women's Tennis Classic